Ronald Arévalo (born 18 May 2003) is a footballer who plays as a winger for striker for New York City FC II in the MLS Next Pro. Born in the United States, he is an El Salvador international.

Career

Arévalo started his career with American fourth tier side Cedar Stars Rush. In 2021, he signed for HB Køge in the Danish second tier. Before the 2022 season, Arévalo signed for Finnish third tier club OTP.

In 2022, he signed for NYCFC II in the American third tier.

References

External links
 

2003 births
American expatriate soccer players
American expatriate sportspeople in Denmark
American expatriate sportspeople in Finland
American people of Salvadoran descent
American soccer players
Association football forwards
Association football wingers
Danish 1st Division players
El Salvador international footballers
Expatriate men's footballers in Denmark
Expatriate footballers in Finland
HB Køge players
Kakkonen players
Living people
MLS Next Pro players
New York City FC II players
Oulun Työväen Palloilijat players
Salvadoran expatriate footballers
Salvadoran expatriate sportspeople in Finland
Salvadoran footballers
USL League Two players